Chatham is the surname of:

 C. J. Chatham (born 1994), American baseball player
 Charles Chatham (1910–1994), English cricketer
 Gerald Chatham (1906–1956), American lawyer, lead prosecutor in the Emmett Till case
 John Chatham (Australian politician) (1866–1925)
 John Purnell Chatham (1872–1914), American sailor and Medal of Honor recipient
 Ray Chatham (1924–1999), English footballer
 Rhys Chatham (born 1952), American musician
 Richard Thurmond Chatham (1896–1957), American politician
 Russell Chatham (born 1939), American landscape artist
 William Chatham (1859–1941), Scottish-born engineer and government official of Hong Kong